Tor Doubles are a series of science fiction books published by Tor Books between 1988 and 1991, mostly in tête-bêche format.  The series was inspired by the Ace Doubles, published between 1952 and 1973.

Titles in the series 

This list is complete and includes ISBN numbers for the United States.

At least one more in the series was prepared but never published: Esther Friesner's Yesterday We Saw Mermaids paired with Lawrence Watt-Evans's The Final Folly of Captain Dancy would have been series number 37.

Notes

References

Science fiction novel series
 
Tête-bêche books